John Work Scott, son of Andrew Scott and Mary Dinsmore, was the sixth and last president of Washington College before its merger with Jefferson College to form Washington & Jefferson College.

A native of Wheeling, West Virginia, Scott graduated from Jefferson College in 1827 and worked as a Presbyterian minister. He was elected president of Washington College on November 10, 1852 and was inaugurated in 1853. He earned a salary of $1000 per year and received a raise to $1500 per year in 1859. In 1860, he was elected president of the Maryland Agricultural College, but was unavailable to serve. By 1862, Washington College's enrollment dropped by about two-thirds, as 90 students joined the armed services to fight in the American Civil War. Scott retired from the presidency in August 1865, ostensibly to smooth the merger between Washington College and Jefferrson College. He continued his career in academia by teaching at West Virginia University, where he also served as acting president 1876-1877.[4]

See also

 Washington & Jefferson College
 President of Washington & Jefferson College

References
4. The History of Education in West Virginia; State Institutions - West Virginia University, Waitman Rabre, Litt. D., 1909, West Virginia State Department of History, p. 57.

1807 births
1879 deaths
19th-century American educators
19th-century Presbyterian ministers
American Presbyterian ministers
Educators from West Virginia
People from Wheeling, West Virginia
Presbyterians from West Virginia
Presidents of the University of Maryland, College Park
Presidents of Washington & Jefferson College
Washington & Jefferson College alumni
West Virginia University faculty
19th-century American clergy